Victor Harbor High School (VHHS) is located in the Fleurieu Peninsula in South Australia.

External links
 Victor Harbor High School website

High schools in South Australia